Marianne Andersson (born 26 May 1942) is a Swedish Centre Party politician and economist.

She was born in Vårgårda to farmer Erik Andersson and Thea Andersson, and married Ivan Andersson in 1963. She graduated as economist from the Gothenburg School of Business, Economics and Law in 1981. She served as a member of the Riksdag from 1985 to 2002.

She joined the board of the Right Livelihood Award foundation from 2004.

References

1942 births
Living people
People from Vårgårda Municipality
University of Gothenburg alumni
Members of the Riksdag from the Centre Party (Sweden)
Women members of the Riksdag
Members of the Riksdag 1994–1998
Members of the Riksdag 1998–2002
21st-century Swedish women politicians
21st-century Swedish economists
Swedish women economists